is the downtown area of the city of  Shimonoseki, Japan. It is known as the most famous sightseeing spot in Yamaguchi Prefecture.

Main sightseeing spots and institutions 
Shops
 SunLive Karato (Shopping center)
 Karato shopping street
 Kamon Wharf (fresh fish shop and restaurant, etc.)
 Karato Come On Inn

Sightseeing
 Kaikyokan (Aquarium) 
 Mount Hino (268.2 m)
 Karato Market (Fresh fish shop etc.)
 Former British Consulate (built in 1906)
 Former Akita Company Building (built in 1915) : Shimonoseki Tour Information Center
 Nabe-cho Post Office (built in 1900)
 Akama Shrine (built in 1191)
 Kameyama Hachiman Shrine (built in 859)
 Kanmon Straits (Kanmonkyo Bridge)
 Dan-no-ura (location of Battle of Dan-no-ura)

Hotels
 Shimonoseki Grand Hotel
 Karato Central Hotel
 Kaikyo View Shimonoseki
 Shunpanro
 Tokyo Dai-ichi Hotel Shimonoseki
 Shimonoseki City Hinoyama Youth Hostel

Others
 Shimonoseki City Hall
 Arcaport development area

Festivals
Shimonoseki Kaikyo Festival (May)
Kanmon Kaikyo Fireworks Festival (August)
Shimonoseki Bakan Festival (August)
Shimonoseki Kaikyo Marathon (November)

Transportation

Ferries
The Kanpu ferry from Shimonoseki Port International Terminal to Pusan in South Korea regularly.
The Orient ferry from Shimonoseki Port International Terminal to Qingdao in China regularly.
The Orient ferry from Shimonoseki Port International Terminal to Shanghai in China regularly.

Trains
Nearby station
Shimonoseki Station (Sanyō Main Line)
Nearby Shinkansen Station
Shin-Shimonoseki Station (Sanyō Shinkansen)

Buses
Nearby bus stop
“Karato” or “Kaikyo Kan (aquarium)” (Sanden Kohtsu Co., Ltd.)

See also
Shimonoseki city
Shimonoseki Station

External links

 Shimonoseki official website in Japanese
 Shimonoseki official website in other languages

Geography of Yamaguchi Prefecture
Tourist attractions in Yamaguchi Prefecture